Below is a list of magazines published in Ireland.

National

Newsstand

Arts and culture
Film Ireland
Hot Press
The Journal of Music - classical, contemporary and new music
State

General interest
Dublin Review of Books
Garda post
Hogan Stand
In Dublin (magazine)
Ireland's Own
Irish Countrysports and Country Life Magazine, Irish hunting, shooting, fishing and country lifestyle magazine
Irish Music (magazine)
Nós - Irish language youth and lifestyle magazine
RTÉ Guide
Saint Martin's Magazine
The Dubliner (magazine)

Homes and interiors
Construct Ireland - bi-monthly sustainable building title
House and Home -  bi-monthly publication 
Image Interiors & Living - bi-monthly publication

Military
An Cosantóir - official monthly magazine of the Irish Defence Forces
Signal - magazine of the Representative Association of Commissioned Officers (RACO)

Motoring
Auto Trader Ireland

News, politics, current affairs and society
An Phoblacht - magazine of Sinn Féin
The Brandsma Review - conservative Roman Catholic magazine
Business and Finance
Business Plus
eolas Magazine - public policy, politics and business magazine
forth - outspoken current affairs review
History Ireland
Humanism Ireland
IRIS Magazine - Sinn Féin magazine
The Irish Humanist
Irish Political Review
Look Left - broad left magazine published by the Workers' Party
Magill - political and cultural review
The Phoenix - satirical and investigative magazine
Saoirse Irish Freedom - monthly magazine of Republican Sinn Féin
The Starry Plough - magazine of the Irish Republican Socialist Party
Village - monthly political magazine

Technology
ComputerScope
Ireland's PC Live! - consumer technology and computing

Other
Gay Community News (GCN) - Ireland's oldest (and free) gay magazine

Magazine supplements to newspapers
Innovation - monthly technology supplement to the Irish Times

Trade and professional
ComputerScope
Garda Review
Irish Builder
Irish Medical Times
Plan - independent monthly architecture title

Regional
Galway Now
Ulster Tatler

Defunct magazines
Dawn and Dawn Train - Irish pacifist magazines, linked with the International Fellowship of Reconciliation
Dublin Opinion
Fortnight Magazine - Northern Irish political magazine  
Gralton magazine - leftist magazine
Red Patriot and Voice of Revolution - Maoist, anti-clerical, pro-Irish republican magazines published by the Communist Party of Ireland (Marxist–Leninist)
The Ripening of Time - Marxist magazine
Kiss (Irish magazine)

References

Defunct magazines published in Ireland
Magazines
Ireland